Jakub Auguston Jr. (born Giacomo Agustoni; c. 1668, possibly in Rome – 3 August 1735, Plzeň) was a Czech Baroque architect of Italian descent. He worked in Plzeň and Western Bohemia.

Work
His works include Chotěšov Abbey, Nebílovy Castle and the Church of Saints Anne and Rose of Lima in Plzeň. He is buried in the church's crypt.

External links 
 Tomáš Jílek, Viktor Viktora: Cultural and spiritual development of Western Bohemia in the Baroque period.  (in Czech)

References 

1668 births
1735 deaths
17th-century Italian architects
17th-century Bohemian people
18th-century Bohemian people
Czech Baroque architects
Italian Baroque architects
Czech people of Italian descent